The Tavener-Sears Tavern, on Main St. in Mount Sterling, Ohio, was built in 1841.  It was listed on the National Register of Historic Places in 1982.

It is in Hopewell Township, Muskingum County, Ohio.  It was a brick building.

It was later a private residence.

It has been destroyed.

References

National Register of Historic Places in Muskingum County, Ohio
Federal architecture in Ohio
Buildings and structures completed in 1841